Milk River (Madge) Airport  is an abandoned aerodrome that was located  south-east of Milk River, Alberta, Canada.

See also
Milk River Airport

References

External links
Page about this airport on COPA's Places to Fly airport directory

Defunct airports in Alberta